The Lost Canyon Cowboy Camp was a line camp operated by the Scorup-Sommerville Cattle Company in what would become Canyonlands National Park, Utah. There is a little built structure; the site is significant for its in situ artifacts and graffiti, located beneath a rock overhang. The shelter was used from 1919 through the late 1960s when the park was established.

See also
 Cave Springs Cowboy Camp

References

National Register of Historic Places in San Juan County, Utah
National Register of Historic Places in Canyonlands National Park